Traditionally, a jersey is an item of knitted clothing, generally made of wool or cotton, with sleeves, worn as a pullover, as it does not open at the front, unlike a cardigan. It is usually close-fitting and machine knitted in contrast to a guernsey that is more often hand knit with a thicker yarn. The word is usually used interchangeably with sweater.

Alternatively, the shirt worn by members of a sports team as part of the team uniform is also referred to as a jersey.

Etymology
Jersey, in the Channel Islands, was famous for its knitting trade in medieval times, and because of that original fame, the name "jersey" is still applied to many forms of knitted fabric, which transferred to the garments made from the fabric.

In sports

A sports jersey is a shirt worn by members of a team to identify their affiliation with the team.  Jerseys identify their wearers' names and/or numbers, generally showing the colors and logo of the team.  Numbers are frequently used to identify players, since uniforms give players a similar appearance.

A jersey may also include the logo of the team's sponsor.

Examples 

A cycling jersey is a specialised jersey designed to be used in road cycling. Cycling jerseys are usually made of synthetic microfiber material to aid in wicking sweat away from the skin to allow it to evaporate. Specific colours or patterns represent certain statuses in these races, such as the yellow jersey of the leader of the general classification in the Tour de France, or the rainbow jersey for the world champion.

The main garment of an ice hockey uniform, which was traditionally called a sweater, is increasingly known as a hockey jersey. Basketball jerseys are usually sleeveless. Baseball jerseys are usually button up.

In Australian rules football, the player's shirt is known as a "guernsey".

Other examples are the third jersey, hockey jersey, basketball uniform, baseball uniform and gridiron football uniform.

See also

Kit (association football)
Kit (cycling)
Kit (rugby football)
Jersey finger

References

External links
 

Sweaters
Sportswear
History of fashion
History of clothing (Western fashion)
Tops (clothing)
Knitted fabrics
Knitted garments
Woolen clothing